Baiburt may refer to:
 Bayburt, Turkey
 Bayburd, Armenia